This is a list of properties and districts in Clarke County, Georgia that are listed on the National Register of Historic Places (NRHP).

Current listings

|}

References

Clarke
Buildings and structures in Clarke County, Georgia